George D. Beers (June 7, 1812 – October 12, 1880) was an American politician from New York.

Life
He was born in Hobart, New York to of Congressman Cyrus Beers and Phebe Beers (née Gregory). The family removed first to Delhi, the seat of Delaware County, and in 1821 to Walton. Later the family moved to Ithaca. There he studied law, was admitted to the bar in 1833, and practiced. He married Harriet Beers, and they had several children.

He was a member of the New York State Senate (5th D.) from 1845 to 1847, sitting in the 68th, 69th and 70th New York State Legislatures.

He was buried at the Ithaca City Cemetery.

Sources
The New York Civil List compiled by Franklin Benjamin Hough (pages 135f and 138; Weed, Parsons and Co., 1858)
The American Biographical Sketch Book by William Hunt (1849; pg. 349ff)

External links

1812 births
1880 deaths
People from Hobart, New York
Politicians from Ithaca, New York
Democratic Party New York (state) state senators
19th-century American politicians